Walther Nehring (15 August 1892 – 20 April 1983) was a German general in the Wehrmacht during World War II who commanded the Afrika Korps.

Early life
Nehring was born on 15 August 1892 in Stretzin, West Prussia. Nehring was the descendant of a Dutch family who had fled the Netherlands to escape religious persecution in the seventeenth century. His father, Emil Nehring, was an estate owner and officer of the Military Reserve. While Nehring was still a child the family moved to Danzig.

Career
Nehring joined the military service on 16 September 1911 in the Infanterie-Regiment 152. He became a commissioned Leutnant on 18 December 1913. 

On 26 October 1940 he received command of the 18th Panzer Division at Chemnitz, which he commanded during the operations Barbarossa and Typhoon. The division led by Nehring stands accused of war crimes by numerous accounts.

Nehring took command of the Afrika Korps in May 1942 and took part in the last major Axis offensive (Operation Brandung) of the Western Desert campaign and the subsequent Battle of Alam Halfa (31 August - 7 September 1942), during which he was wounded in an air raid. Between November and December 1942, he commanded the LXXXX Army Corps, the German contingent in Tunisia.

After North Africa, Nehring was posted to the Eastern Front where he commanded first the XXIV Panzer Corps, and then from July to August 1944 the Fourth Panzer Army.  Nehring then returned to the XXIV in August 1944 and led the Corps until March 1945 when he was made commander of the 1st Panzer Army. During 1944 he was also the commanding officer of the XXXXVIII Panzer Corps.

Following the end of the war, Nehring wrote a comprehensive history of the German panzer forces from 1916 to 1945, Die Geschichte der deutschen Panzerwaffe 1916 bis 1945. He also wrote the foreword to Len Deighton's  Blitzkrieg: From the Rise of Hitler to the Fall of Dunkirk.

Awards
 Iron Cross (1914) 2nd Class (27 January 1915) & 1st Class (25 November 1917)
 Clasp to the Iron Cross (1939)  2nd Class (11 September 1939) & 1st Class (29 September 1939)
 Knight's Cross of the Iron Cross with Oak Leaves and Swords
 Knight's Cross on 24 July 1941 as Generalmajor and commander of the 18. Panzer-Division
 383rd Oak Leaves on 8 February 1944 as General der Panzertruppe and commanding general of the XXIV. Panzerkorps
 124th Swords on 22 January 1945 as General der Panzertruppe and commanding general of the XXIV. Panzerkorps
 Bundesverdienstkreuz 1st Class (27 July 1973)

References
Citations

Bibliography

 
 
 
 

1892 births
1983 deaths
People from Człuchów County
People from West Prussia
Generals of Panzer Troops
German Army personnel of World War I
Prussian Army personnel
Recipients of the Knight's Cross of the Iron Cross with Oak Leaves and Swords
Recipients of the clasp to the Iron Cross, 1st class
Recipients of the Silver Medal of Military Valor
Officers Crosses of the Order of Merit of the Federal Republic of Germany
Crosses of Military Merit
Reichswehr personnel
20th-century Freikorps personnel